"The Charmers" is the twenty-third episode of the third series of the 1960s cult British spy-fi television series The Avengers, starring Patrick Macnee and Honor Blackman. It was first broadcast by ABC on 29 February 1964. The episode was directed by Bill Bain and written by Brian Clemens.

Plot
After a number of Soviet agents are murdered by an unknown third party, Steed and Cathy co-operate with their Russian counterparts to find the assassins.

Cast
 Patrick Macnee as John Steed
 Honor Blackman as Cathy Gale
 Fenella Fielding as Kim Lawrence 
 Warren Mitchell as Keller 
 Brian Oulton as Mr. Edgar 
 Vivian Pickles as Betty Smythe 
 John Barcroft as Martin 
 Malcolm Russell as Horace J. Cleeves 
 Frank Mills as Harrap 
 John Greenwood as Sam 
 Peter Porteous as George Vinkel

References

External links

Episode overview on The Avengers Forever! website

The Avengers (season 3) episodes
1964 British television episodes